Ophelia Settle Egypt (February 20, 1903 – May 25, 1984), also known as E. Ophelia Settle, was a social worker and sociologist who conducted some of the first oral history interviews with formerly enslaved people.

Early life and education 
Ophelia Settle was born near Clarksville, Texas in 1903, the daughter of Green Wilson Settle and Sara Garth Settle. Her father was a schoolteacher. Settle graduated from high school in Denver, Colorado in 1921, and from Howard University in 1925. 

She earned a master's degree in sociology from the University of Pennsylvania in 1944, and pursued further studies at Columbia University School of Social Work.  She studied medicine and sociology at Washington University on a fellowship from the National Society for the Prevention of Blindness, but as a black woman she was considered a "special student", and required to take lessons privately from a tutor.

Career 
Settle taught in North Carolina during the year after she graduated from Howard University. She was a researcher for the black sociologist Charles S. Johnson at Fisk University in Nashville, Tennessee from 1928 to 1930. Under Johnson, she conducted one hundred interviews with elderly formerly enslaved people. Her interviews were part of Fisk University's publication “Unwritten History of Slavery: Autobiographical Accounts of Negro Ex-Slaves (Social Science Source Document No. 1).” From 1933 to 1935, she was a caseworker in St. Louis, Missouri. 

In 1935, Settle became director of social services at Dillard University in Louisiana. She taught social work at Howard University in the 1940s. In the 1950s, she was a probation officer and social worker in southeast Washington, D.C. directed a home for black "unwed mothers", and in 1956 founded the area's first Planned Parenthood clinic. In 1973, Egypt was a member of the D.C. Black Writers Workshop, and wrote a biography of James Weldon Johnson for young readers, published in 1974. She corresponded with writer Langston Hughes, among other notable acquaintances. She gave an oral history interview in 1981 and 1982, to the Moorland-Spingarn Research Center.

Personal life and legacy 
Ophelia Settle married educator Ivory Lester Egypt in 1940. They had a son, Ivory Lester Jr., born in 1942. The Parklands Planned Parenthood Clinic was named for Egypt in 1981, three years before she died from lung problems in Washington, D.C., aged 81 years. The Ophelia Egypt Papers, including photographs and manuscripts, are archived in the manuscript division, Howard University Library.

References

1903 births
1984 deaths
Columbia University School of Social Work alumni
University of Pennsylvania School of Arts and Sciences alumni
American social workers
American women sociologists